José David Rosário da Costa (15 August 1924 – 29 May 2015), known just as Rosário, was a Portuguese footballer who played as a forward.

He represented clubs like Cartaxo, Elvas and Atlético, but was most known for his six-year spell at Benfica, where he won six major titles, including the Latin Cup.

Career
Born in Porto de Muge, Cartaxo, Rosário started playing at SL Cartaxo, before moving to SL Elvas. He signed with Benfica in 1948, and made his debut on 19 September, against Olhanense. In his first year, he competed with Corona, Espírito Santo and Rogério Pipi, so his playing time was limited to 12 games. His second season was better, as he assumed a starting role alongside Julinho and Corona, helping the club win the league and the Latin Cup. Rosário kept his place in the first team in the following three years, partnering with José Águas and Rogério, to win three Portuguese Cups.

In his final season at Benfica, 1953–54, he lost his place to Palmeiro, and played only three games, his last on 4 January 1954, against Académica de Coimbra. Afterwards, he represented Atlético until 1957. He died on 29 May 2015, at age 90.

Honours
Benfica
Primeira Divisão: 1949–50 
Taça de Portugal: 1948–49, 1950–51, 1951–52, 1952–53
Latin Cup: 1949–50

References
General
 

Specific

External links

1924 births
2015 deaths
People from Cartaxo
Portuguese footballers
Association football forwards
Primeira Liga players
O Elvas C.A.D. players
S.L. Benfica footballers
Atlético Clube de Portugal players
Sportspeople from Santarém District